Lake W. R. Holway, or Chimney Rock Lake is a reservoir in Mayes County, Oklahoma on the Saline Creek arm of Lake Hudson (Oklahoma). It was created in 1968 by the Grand River Dam Authority (GRDA) as an integral part of the Salina Pumped Storage Project. It is northeast of Locust Grove and southeast of Salina, Oklahoma. Originally named Chimney Rock Lake, it was renamed in 1981 to honor W. R. Holway, the consulting engineer who was responsible for constructing the Spavinaw Water Project, Pensacola Dam, and other important projects. Its primary purpose is peak power generation.

The lake covers 712 acres and has a shoreline of  21 miles.

A hydrographic survey of the lake in 2009 resulted in the following dimensions for the normal lake at an elevation of 865 ft:

Area 762 acres
Volume 50,372 acre-ft
Mean depth 66.1 ft
Maximum depth 182 ft.

History

Public usage
This lake is also a popular location for fishing, especially for bass, crappie and catfish. GRDA prohibits swimming and the use of internal combustion engines on the reservoir.

References

External links
 "Hydrographic Survey of W. R. Holway Reservoir". Oklahoma Water Resources Board. August 12, 2009.

Holway
Protected areas of Mayes County, Oklahoma
Dams completed in 1968
Holway